The Chariton Masonic Temple in Chariton, Iowa is an Art Deco-style building from 1937 designed by William L. Perkins.

It was listed on the National Register of Historic Places in 2006.  It was deemed significant as the last major Chariton work by William L. Perkins, and "as a fine example of Art Deco
design executed in stone and brick."

Photo gallery

References

Chariton, Iowa
Clubhouses on the National Register of Historic Places in Iowa
Masonic buildings completed in 1937
Buildings and structures in Lucas County, Iowa
Masonic buildings in Iowa
National Register of Historic Places in Lucas County, Iowa